Veris may refer to:
Veris Ltd, surveying firm in Australia
Primula veris, flowering plant
Veris printer, inkjet printer
Lacus Veris, lunar mare
FC Veris, Moldovan football club
Boletus rex-veris, basidiomycete fungus
Věříš si?, Czech television game show

People
Garin Veris (born 1963), American football player
Kyle Veris (born 1983), American soccer player